Pocker may refer to:

A nickname for the Devil
A short name for the pool game poker pocket billiards
A common misspelling of the card game poker